Yaetta or Eeta is a 1978 released Malayalam film directed by I. V. Sasi starring Kamal Haasan, Madhu, Sheela and Seema. It deals with a love triangle:  Sheela and Seema fall in love with Kamal Haasan. The movie is known for some steamy scenes. M. G. Soman played the cunning villain Gopalan. Kamal Haasan won the Filmfare Award for Best Actor – Malayalam. It was dubbed and released in Tamil as Inba Thagam.

Plot

Gopalan (M. G. Soman) is a local owner of a cane wholesale business as he purchases the canes from workers and sells them for a high price. But he is a dishonest person as he smuggles in sandalwood too, between cane business. Varuthunni (Madhu) is the chief of workers and they believe Gopalan. Varuthunni's adopted son is Ramu (Kamal Haasan) and he is in love with Sreedevi, (Seema) daughter of Narayanan, (Jose Prakash) co-worker of Varuthunni. Annamma (Sheela) is a widow and she too likes Ramu, even though he is younger than her.

Gopalan gets caught in sandalwood smuggling, but escapes by blaming Varuthunni. The conflict between Varuthunni and Gopalan creates issues among the cane workers and most of them join forces with Varuthunni as he is an honest person. The workers decide to provide cane only to Varuthunni and not to Gopalan, which hurts Gopalan's business and his equation with his boss. In the meantime, Annamma, seduces Ramu and they become intimate.

Gopalan's team destroys Varuthunni's cane stacks and thus the issue between the two gets bigger. Sensing the danger of the situation, Gopalan decides to bump off Varuthunni, but this plan was informed to Ramu, who is down by fever by Varuthunni's friend (Sankaradi). At the same time, Annamma reveals to Ramu that she is pregnant.

Shattered, Ramu, unable to make a decision frantically goes in search of his father Varuthunni to save him from the death plot of Gopalan, but he is beaten to pulp by Gopalan's gang. He traces his father, but before he is informed of the plot, Gopalan shoots Varuthunni, but the bullet hits Ramu as he jumps in front of his father to save him. Shattered, Varuthunni kills Gopalan and Ramu in his last moments requests his father to take care of his child, now carried by Annamma, and dies in the lap of his loving father Varuthunni shattering many dreams and hopes.

Cast 
 Kamal Haasan as Ramu
 Madhu as Varuthunni
 Sheela as Annamma
 Seema as Sreedevi
 M. G. Soman as Gopalan
 Jose Prakash as Narayanan
 Kuthiravattam Pappu as Paramu
 Sankaradi as Annamma's Father
 Meena
 Kaviyoor Ponnamma as Philomina, Annamma's Mother
Junior Sheela
 Kottayam Santha
 Janardhanan as Kurup
 Prem Prakash as Abraham

Soundtrack 
The music was composed by G. Devarajan and the lyrics were written by Yusufali Kechery.

Awards 
Filmfare Awards South
 Kamal Haasan won Filmfare Award for Best Actor – Malayalam. 
 I. V. Sasi won Filmfare Award for Best Director – Malayalam.

References

Works cited

External links 
 

1970s Malayalam-language films
1978 films
Indian drama films
Films directed by I. V. Sasi
Films with screenplays by Alleppey Sheriff